Stripping is a 2002 Finnish comedy film directed by Saara Saarela. It was entered into the 24th Moscow International Film Festival.

Cast
 Liisa Kuoppamäki as Inka
 Meri Nenonen as Helena
 Marc Gassot as Arno
 Johan Storgård as Luukas
 Tiina Pirhonen
 Mikko Nousiainen as Joonas
 Aarni Ahjolinna
 Elina Knihtilä
 Janne Hyytiäinen
 Laura Birn as Kaupan kassa

References

External links
 

2002 films
2002 comedy films
2000s Finnish-language films
Finnish comedy films